"Here Comes the Hotstepper" is a song co-written and recorded by Jamaican dancehall artist Ini Kamoze. It was released as the lead single from his 1995 album of the same name as well as the soundtrack to the film Prêt-à-Porter. It is known for its "naaaa na na na naaaa..." chorus inspired by the Cannibal and the Headhunters version of "Land of 1000 Dances".

The song was Kamoze's only song to reach the top 40 on the US Billboard Hot 100, peaking atop the chart on December 17, 1994, and remaining there for two weeks. It also became a number-one hit in Denmark, New Zealand, and Zimbabwe and a top-10 hit in 13 other countries. Irish DJ John Gibbons made a remix of the song in 2018.

Usages of music sampling

"Here Comes the Hotstepper" contains several samples, including vocals from "The Champ" by The Mohawks, "Hot Pants" by Bobby Byrd, and "La Di Da Di" by Doug E. Fresh and Slick Rick. The song's instrumental samples the drums and bass from "Heartbeat" by Taana Gardner and guitar notes from "Hung Up on My Baby" by Isaac Hayes. The song uses the "na na na na na..." chorus from the Cannibal and the Headhunters version of "Land of a Thousand Dances," and the verse vocal melody is reminiscent of The Beatles' "Come Together", which was inspired by Chuck Berry's "You Can't Catch Me".

Chart performance
"Here Comes the Hotstepper" remains Kamoze's biggest hit to date. It went to number one on the US Billboard Hot 100 and on the Canadian RPM Dance/Urban chart, while peaking at number two at the US Cash Box Top 100. In Europe, it peaked at number one in Denmark as well as on the Eurochart Hot 100. The single climbed into the top 10 in Austria (6), Belgium (Flanders (4) and Wallonia (3)), Finland (2), France (2), Germany (6), Iceland (3), Ireland (3), Norway (4), Spain (2), Sweden (5), Switzerland (4), and the United Kingdom. In the latter nation, it peaked at number four during its third week on the UK Singles Chart, on January 15, 1995, and spent four weeks at that position, topping the UK R&B Chart in the process. Elsewhere, "Here Comes the Hotstepper" topped the charts in New Zealand and Zimbabwe and peaked at number two in Australia.

The single was awarded with a gold record in France and Germany and a platinum record in Australia, New Zealand, the UK, and the US.

Critical reception
Stephen Thomas Erlewine from AllMusic noted that the song "lifts a line from "Land of 1000 Dances", and places it on an infectious dancehall beat -- it's a great single that deserved to be a huge hit." Larry Flick from Billboard wrote, "Reggae-splashed pop/hip-hopper is fueled by a prominent sample of Taana Gardner's disco chestnut "Heartbeat". Already getting active attention, infectious party jam percolates with innocuous but appealing rapping and familiar chants. Don't be surprised if this sleeper soars past the expected hits to the top of the Hot 100." In his weekly UK chart commentary, James Masterton stated that the "infectious dance track owes much of its success to the 'Na Na Na Na Na' hook". A reviewer from Music & Media commented, "Let's go "funkin' for Jamaica" again. Included on the OST Prêt-à-Porter, the veteran reggae man unexpectedly sees himself in the US top 10 with a chunk of '80s fatback funk."

British magazine Music Weeks RM Dance Update complimented the song as a "catchy funk anthem doing the business in the US". An editor, James Hamilton, described it as a "lyrical gangster's madly infectious US smash reggae jiggler using the 'naa na-na-naa' chant from 'Land Of A 1000 Dances'". Charles Aaron from Spin viewed it as a "seamless, nonsensical string of ragamuffin hip-hop clichés." He added further, "Rivaling Joey Gardner's sample constructions for K7 [with "Come Baby Come"], producer Salaam Remi drops in the bass line from Taana Gardner's 1981 club classic [...], and next thing you know, you're humming "murderer" against your will. Kamoze is a Kingston native, a vet of four supposedly respectable albums, an author and playwright, but on this Top Ten hit, he could be Jah Blatt from down the block. Deeply disposable." Steve Pick from St. Louis Post-Dispatch wrote, "With this cut, he's distilled most of the stylistic variants of his competitors, sweetened them with some goof hooks and come up with a breakthrough pop record that threatens to keep folks dancing for the next several years. I'm not sure what's "Heartical" about this version, but this is the mix you want."

Music video
Two music videos were made to accompany the song. The remix version used various scenes from the film Prêt-à-Porter. It was later published by Vevo on YouTube in May 2014, and had generated more than 31 million views as of January 2023.

Impact and legacy
Blender listed the song at number 492 in their ranking of "The 500 Greatest Songs Since You Were Born" in 2005. BuzzFeed listed it at number 46 in their list of "The 101 Greatest Dance Songs Of the '90s" in 2017. Billboard placed "Here Comes the Hotstepper" at number 126 in their ranking of "Billboards Top Songs of the '90s" in 2019.

In 2020, American singer Nicky Jam and Puerto Rican rapper Daddy Yankee interpolated the song's hook for the single "Muévelo", from the Bad Boys for Life soundtrack, as did Israeli musical duo Static & Ben El for their single "Further Up (Na, Na, Na, Na, Na)" alongside American rapper Pitbull. That same year, Parquet Courts frontman and artist A. Savage designed a t-shirt, Excuse Me Mister Officer (Murderer), named for a line in the song's pre-chorus, to honor victims of police brutality, the proceeds from which he donated to various US- and New York-based anti-prison organizations.

In 2021, Philadelphia-based musician and social media personality Pat Finnerty enlisted Dr. Dog to cover the track for the "Hey, Soul Sister" episode of his YouTube series, What Makes This Song Stink.

The song was featured in the second episode of the twelfth season of the sitcom It's Always Sunny in Philadelphia

The song was included in the 2022 film, Sonic the Hedgehog 2, and plays during a scene where the titular character is left home alone.

The song was performed by Peter Griffin and his terminator clone in Season 19 Episode 13 of the cartoon Family Guy.

The song was included in the launch trailer for the video game Yakuza: Like a Dragon.

Track listing
 CD single"Here Comes the Hotstepper" (Heartical Mix)
"Here Comes the Hotstepper" (Allaam Mix)

 CD maxi – Europe (1994)'
 "Here Comes the Hotstepper" (Heartical Mix) – 4:13
 "Here Comes the Hotstepper" (Heartipella) – 4:15
 "Here Comes the Hotstepper" (Heartimental) – 4:13
 "Here Comes the Hotstepper" (Allaam Mix) – 4:36
 "Here Comes the Hotstepper" (Allamental) – 4:37
 "Here Comes the Hotstepper" (LP Version) – 4:09

Charts

Weekly charts

Year-end charts

Decade-end charts

Certifications

References

Film theme songs
1994 singles
1994 songs
Billboard Hot 100 number-one singles
Columbia Records singles
European Hot 100 Singles number-one singles
Hip hop songs
Ini Kamoze songs
Number-one singles in Denmark
Number-one singles in New Zealand
Number-one singles in Zimbabwe
Reggae fusion songs
Song recordings produced by Salaam Remi
Songs written by Salaam Remi
Songs written for films